Nicholas de Groot (born 22 October 1975) is a Canadian cricketer. He is a right-handed batsman and a right-arm medium-pace bowler with an elegant batting action who has played for both Canada and Guyana. With few chances at Guyanese cricket from his start in 1994/95, he turned to Canada for the 2001 ICC Trophy, making crucial contributions for this competition and qualification for the 2003 Cricket World Cup. He played in all Canada's World Cup matches in 2003, but has only played twice for them since.

References

1975 births
Living people
Canada One Day International cricketers
Canadian cricketers
Cricketers from Ontario
Canadian sportspeople of Guyanese descent
Guyana cricketers
Naturalized citizens of Canada